Yngve Zotterman (20 September 1898 in Vadstena – 13 March 1982 in Stockholm) was a Swedish neurophysiologist who received his medical training at the Karolinska Institute. He conducted pioneering studies on nerve conduction together with Edgar Adrian. He then worked on sensory function of skin, particularly related to pain, heat and the neurochemistry of taste buds.

He was elected a member of the Royal Swedish Academy of Engineering Sciences in 1949, and of the Royal Swedish Academy of Sciences in 1953.

See also
Rate coding

References

1898 births
1982 deaths
Swedish neuroscientists
Karolinska Institute alumni
Members of the Royal Swedish Academy of Engineering Sciences
Members of the Royal Swedish Academy of Sciences
Neurophysiologists